Mission San José may refer to:
Mission San José (California), a Spanish mission in Fremont, California
Mission San Jose, Fremont, California, a neighborhood
Mission San Jose High School, a high school in Fremont, California
Mission San José (Texas), a Spanish mission in San Antonio, Texas
Misión San José de Comondú, Baja California Sur